Ladies of the Night Club is a 1928 American comedy film directed by George Archainbaud and starring Ricardo Cortez, Barbara Leonard and Lee Moran. It was produced during the transition to sound film and is essentially a silent film with an added soundtrack and sound effects. The film's sets were designed by the art director Hervey Libbert.

Synopsis
The wealthy millionaire patron of a nightclub is attracted by the female half of a vaudeville show and showers her with gifts. This upsets her stage partner who hopes to marry her despite his limited wealth.

Cast
 Ricardo Cortez as George Merrill
 Barbara Leonard as 	Dimples Revere
 Lee Moran as 	Joe Raggs
 Douglas Gerrard as 	Cyril Bathstowe
 Cissy Fitzgerald as Bossy Hart
 Charles K. Gerrard as

References

Bibliography
 Munden, Kenneth White. The American Film Institute Catalog of Motion Pictures Produced in the United States, Part 1. University of California Press, 1997.

External links

 

1928 films
1928 comedy films
1920s English-language films
American black-and-white films
Films directed by George Archainbaud
Tiffany Pictures films